Asner is a surname. Notable people with the surname include:

 Ed Asner (1929–2021), American film, television, stage, and voice actor
 Jules Asner (born 1968), American television personality, writer, and fashion model
 Kate Asner (born 1966), American actress and daughter of Ed Asner
 Milivoj Ašner (1913–2011), police chief in the Independent State of Croatia

See also 

 Aschner